Rafael Vásquez may refer to

Rafael Vásquez (politician), Peruvian politician
Rafael Vásquez (baseball), former Major League Baseball pitcher
Ráfael Vásquez (general), general in the Mexican Army